Chappelle is a surname of French origin, a variant of the word chapelle meaning "chapel". Notable people with the name include:
 Bill Chappelle (1881–1944), American baseball player
 Charles W. Chappelle (1872–1941), African-American aviation pioneer 
 Dave Chappelle (born 1973), American comedian, actor, and social commentator
 Joe Chappelle, American producer and director
 Julius Caesar Chappelle (1852–1904), African-American legislator 
 Pat H. Chappelle (1869–1911), African-American founder of the Rabbit's Foot Company vaudeville show
 William D. Chappelle (1857–1925), church minister and formerly enslaved African-American

In fiction

 Ryan Chappelle, a character played by Paul Schulze on 24

See also
 Chappelle's Show, a sketch comedy series starring Dave Chappelle
 Chappelle and Stinnette Records, a small independent United States record label of the early 1920s
 Chappelle, Edmonton, a neighborhood of Edmonton, Canada
 Chapelle (disambiguation)
 Chapelle (surname)

French-language surnames